The 1893 Georgia Tech football team represented the Georgia Institute of Technology during the 1893 college football season. It was the team's second ever season, featuring its first ever victory.

Schedule

References

External links 

 

Georgia Tech
Georgia Tech Yellow Jackets football seasons
Georgia Tech football